SuccessTech Academy is an alternative public high school in  downtown Cleveland, Ohio, United States. It is part of the Cleveland Metropolitan School District. A grant from the Bill & Melinda Gates Foundation helped to establish the school, which opened to enrollment in the 2002–2003 school year. SuccessTech Academy offers a technology infused high school curriculum with a focus on problem and project based learning.

All 59 students in the school's first senior class (2005-2006) were college-bound.

As of the 2009–2010 school year, SuccessTech's graduation rate was 94.9%

School shooting

A school shooting occurred on October 10, 2007. A 14-year-old student, Asa Coon, shot two teens and two faculty members at the school. According to Cleveland Division of Police, the student fatally shot himself. The student was reportedly angered over a suspension given to him earlier in the week, and school authorities confirmed he was not supposed to be at school on that day. Police said that the student had entered the school with two revolvers, one in each hand, and began firing. According to law enforcement personnel the shootings took place on the third and fourth floor when at that time the lockdown announcement, "Code Blue" was made.

References

External links
2006-2007 School Year Report Card
2007-2008 School Year Report Card
2008-2009 School Year Report Card
2009-2010 School Year Report Card
2010-2011 School Year Report Card

Educational institutions established in 2002
High schools in Cuyahoga County, Ohio
Education in Cleveland
Public high schools in Ohio
Alternative schools in the United States
2002 establishments in Ohio
Cleveland Metropolitan School District